Methionyl aminopeptidase (methionine aminopeptidase, peptidase M, L-methionine aminopeptidase, MAP) is an enzyme. This enzyme catalyses the following chemical reaction

 Release of N-terminal amino acids, preferentially methionine, from peptides and arylamides

This membrane-bound enzymatic activity is present in both prokaryotes and eukaryotes.  Proteins possessing this activity include METAP1 and METAP2.

References

External links 
 

EC 3.4.11